Harry Raymond "Shine" Kinderdine (March 18, 1893 - February 17, 1947) was an American football offensive guard who played one game in the National Football League (NFL) for the Dayton Triangles in 1924. He had two brothers that also played for the Triangles, George and Walt.

Kinderdine was elected as the Montgomery County, Ohio sheriff in 1944. He held that position until his death in 1947.

References

1893 births
1947 deaths
Dayton Triangles players
American football offensive guards
Players of American football from Ohio
People from Miamisburg, Ohio